Monte Masi is a South Australian artist, curator and arts educator.

Biography 

Monte Masi was born in Adelaide in 1983 and is a performance-based video artist. (Samstag page) He has a Bachelor of Visual Art (Hons) and a Master of Visual Art from the University of South Australia (MA Thesis) and a Master of Fine Art (Social Practice) from the California College of the Arts. He lectures at Adelaide Central School of Art and was a founding member of the artist-run initiative FeltSpace. He has exhibited in Australia and the United States.

Artistic style and subject 

Masi works in the field of performance-based video art. His videos feature him in the “roles of critic, curator, fan and artist simultaneously, questioning how these operate within contemporary art and the complementary and problematic aspects of each”. His artworks can be viewed on Vimeo.

Awards/Prizes/Residencies 

Masi was awarded a Samstag Scholarship in 2012.

Further reading 

 Huppatz, Matt (2011). FELTspace Gold. Adelaide, SA
 Knights, Mary (2010). Heartlines : 27–28 February 2010. SASA Gallery, University of South Australia, Adelaide, SA.
 Knights, Mary Alison (2011). Vague Possibilities. University of South Australia. 
 Lawton-Masi, Monte (2012). ‘This will be (me) on video : an investigation into the production and distribution of online 'vernacular' video in order to critically inform a body of original contemporary artworks’. [Thesis]. University of South Australia.

References

External links 

 Monte Masi on Vimeo
 Monte Masi on Youtube
 Personal website

Living people
1983 births
Artists from South Australia
Australian contemporary artists
Artists from Adelaide
20th-century Australian artists
21st-century Australian artists
Australian art teachers